Lucky Chances is a 1990 television mini-series written by Jackie Collins and based on her bestselling novels Chances and Lucky. It starred Vincent Irizarry, Sandra Bullock, Eric Braeden, Nicollette Sheridan, Anne-Marie Johnson, Phil Morris, David McCallum, Richard Anderson and Robert Duncan McNeill. It was directed by Buzz Kulik.

Cast
Vincent Irizarry - Gino Santangelo
Nicollette Sheridan - Lucky Santangelo
Sandra Bullock - Maria Santangelo
Harold Pruett - Dario Santangelo
Alan Rosenberg - Costa Zennocotti
Anne-Marie Johnson - Carrie Dimes
Tim Ryan - Lennie Golden
Phil Morris - Steven Dimes
David McCallum - Bernard Dimes
Richard Anderson - Mr. Duke
Mary Frann - Clementine Duke
Eric Braeden - Dimitri Stanislopolous
Michael Nader - Enzio Bonnatti
Stephanie Beacham - Susan Martino
Shawnee Smith - Olympia Stanisopolous Golden
Grant Show - Marco
Jimmie F. Skaggs - Whitejack
Raquel Alessi - Maria Santangelo - Age 6
Luca Bercovici - Santino Bonnatti
Tony DiBenedetto - Pinky
Wanda De Jesus - Suzita
Liliana Komorowska - Francesca Fern
Robert Duncan McNeill - Craven Richmond
Jack Angeles - Fat Larry

External links

1990s American television miniseries
1990 American television series debuts
Santangelo novels